Rasa Imanalijeva is a former Lithuanian football striker and current referee, who played for Gintra Universitetas in the A Lyga. She has been the league's top scorer in the 2008, 2009, 2010 and 2011 seasons.

She has been a member of the Lithuanian national team.

References

External links
 

1991 births
Living people
Lithuanian women's footballers
Women's association football forwards
Lithuania women's international footballers
Gintra Universitetas players